Bia East District is one of the nine districts in Western North Region, Ghana. It was formerly part of the then-larger Bia District until the Eastern part was split off in 2012 to form the Bia East District while the Western part was renamed as Bia West District.The district assembly is located in the northwest part of Western North Region and has Sefwi Adabokrom as its capital town.
The larger Bia District was created from the former Sefwi-Bibiani District in 2004.

Geography
Bia East District borders Dormaa District to the East, Asunafo North District to the North, Juabeso to the South and Bia West District to the West.

References

External links
 Ghana Districts
 Bia East District

References

Districts of the Western North Region